Sarab-e Sheykh Musa (also Romanized as Sarāb-e Sheykh Mūsá) is a village in Beyranvand-e Jonubi Rural District, Bayravand District, Khorramabad County, Lorestan Province, Iran. At the 2006 census, its population was 21, in 5 families.

References 

Towns and villages in Khorramabad County